Siedlisko  is a village in the administrative district of Gmina Trzcianka, within Czarnków-Trzcianka County, Greater Poland Voivodeship, in west-central Poland.

The village has a population of 1,000.

When the area was part of Germany (from 1772 to 1945), it was called Stieglitz.

References

Siedlisko